Pirlar-e Sofla (also Romanized as Pīrlar-e Soflá; also known as Pīrlar-e Pā'īn) is a village in Seyyedan Rural District, Abish Ahmad District, Kaleybar County, East Azerbaijan Province, Iran. At the 2006 census, its population was 255, in 50 families.

References 

Populated places in Kaleybar County